Grace Chalmers Paterson was a campaigner, suffragist, temperance activist and educationalist.

Early life
Paterson was born in Glasgow to Georgina Smith and William Paterson, a merchant.

Domestic education

She campaigned for the improvement of domestic education for working class girls. She was a friend and supporter of Janet Galloway and Christian Guthrie Wright, founder of the Edinburgh School of Cookery.

She was one of the first women elected to a school board in Glasgow, in 1885. She also founded the Glasgow school of cookery, alongside Margaret Black. She was the "driving force" behind this institution. She was involved in the temperance movement in Scotland.

Women's Suffrage
She was a founder member of the Glasgow and West of Scotland Association for Women's Suffrage. She joined the WSPU in 1907.

References 

Scottish activists
British women's rights activists
People associated with Glasgow
Scottish suffragists
Women's Social and Political Union
British temperance activists
1843 births
1925 deaths
19th-century Scottish women
20th-century Scottish women